Gordon Scott (born Gordon Merrill Werschkul; August 3, 1926 – April 30, 2007) was an American film and television actor known for his portrayal of the fictional character Tarzan in five films (and one compilation of three made-as-a-pilot television episodes) of the Tarzan film series from 1955 to 1960. Gordon Scott was the eleventh Tarzan, starting with Tarzan’s Hidden Jungle (1955). He was "discovered" poolside, and offered "a seven-year contract, a loin cloth, and a new last name."

Early life, education and military service
Scott was born Gordon Merrill Werschkul in Portland, Oregon, one of nine children of advertising man Stanley Werschkul and his wife Alice. He was raised in Oregon and attended the University of Oregon, located in Eugene, Oregon, for one semester.

Upon leaving school, he was drafted into the United States Army in 1944. He served as a drill sergeant and military policeman until he was honorably discharged in 1947. He then worked at a variety of jobs until 1953 when he was spotted by a talent agent while working as a lifeguard at the Sahara Hotel and Casino, located on the Las Vegas Strip in Nevada.

Career
"Due in part to his muscular frame and  height, he was quickly signed to replace Lex Barker as Tarzan" by producer Sol Lesser. Lesser had Gordon change his name because "Werschkul" sounded too much like "Weismueller".

Scott's Tarzan movies ranged from rather cheap re-edited television pilots to large-scale action films with high-production values shot on location in Africa. In his early Tarzan films, he played the character as unworldly and inarticulate, in the mold of Johnny Weissmuller, an earlier Tarzan portrayer. In Scott's later films, after a change in producers, he played a Tarzan who was educated and spoke perfect English, as in the original Edgar Rice Burroughs novels. Scott was the only actor to play Tarzan in both styles.

Fearing he would become typecast as Tarzan, Scott moved to Italy and became a popular star in epics of the péplum genre (known in the United States as sword-and-sandal), featuring handsome bodybuilders as various characters from Greek and Roman myth. Scott was a friend of Steve Reeves, and collaborated with him as Remus to Reeves's Romulus in Duel of the Titans (1961). Scott also played Hercules in a couple of international co-productions during the mid-1960s. As the péplum genre faded, Scott starred in Spaghetti Westerns and Eurospy films. His final film appearance was in The Tramplers (filmed in 1966; released in the United States in 1968).

Personal life
Scott was married two times. His first marriage was with Janice Mae Wynkoop of Oakland, California. They met when he was a lifeguard at Lake Temescal, located in Oakland, California. The couple married in Reno, Nevada, in 1948, and had one child, Karen Judith Werschkul (born August 26, 1948), before divorcing in 1949. He was married to actress Vera Miles, his Tarzan co-star, from 1956 to 1960. He had one son with Miles – Michael, born 1957 – and possibly several other children.
 
For the last two decades of his life, Scott was a popular guest at film conventions and autograph shows.

Death
Scott died, aged 80, in Baltimore, Maryland of lingering complications from multiple heart surgeries earlier in the year.  He is buried in the Kensico Cemetery, located in Valhalla, New York.

Filmography

Tarzan films

Other roles

See also

 List of people from Oregon
 Tarzan in film and other non-print media

References

External links
 
 Gordon Scott's final newspaper interview
 Gordon Scott tribute

1926 births
2007 deaths
20th-century American male actors
21st-century American male actors
American expatriates in Italy
American male film actors
American male television actors
Italian male film actors
Burials at Kensico Cemetery
Male actors from Portland, Oregon
Male actors from Baltimore
People associated with physical culture
Tarzan
United States Army non-commissioned officers
University of Oregon alumni
United States Army personnel of World War II
American military police officers